Vashon Island High School (VHS) is a public high school located on Vashon Island, Washington. Vashon Island High School, a part of the Vashon Island School District, is the only high school to serve the island. VHS runs 9th through 12th grade. The school has two language courses available: French and Spanish. VHS puts on three plays a year within the three drama classes; Theater Arts I, II and Musical Theater. VHS also has a band which puts on three concerts, including a Christmas concert and a Pops concert. The band also competes at a band competition at Stadium High School. The school's athletic mascot is the Pirates.

Campus
In 2018, some of the restroom facilities were to be converted into gender-neutral ones.

Despite being accessible only by ferries, VHS has a large number of off-island commuter students who come from West Seattle, the Kitsap Peninsula (predominantly from Port Orchard), and Tacoma.

Awards and recognition
Vashon Island High School was a 2013 Washington Achievement Award winner for Overall Excellence and High Improvement.

The school was named a national Blue Ribbon School in 2008.

Sports

Vashon Island's sports teams compete in the Nisqually League of WIAA's West Central District.

 Debate (Lincoln-Douglas and Policy).
 Soccer (Boys and Girls)
 Baseball
 Softball
 Boys' football
 Basketball (Boys and Girls)
 Track
 Cross-Country (Boys and Girls)
 Wrestling (Boys and Girls)
 Golf
 Volleyball
 Tennis

Notable alumni
 Mary Matsuda Gruenewald - (memoirist)
 Jason Chorak - Washington Huskies football player - 1996 Pac 10 Defensive Player of the year and All American.

References

External links
Official webpage
School District webpage
The Riptide website
School's OSPI report card 2010-2011

High schools in King County, Washington
Public high schools in Washington (state)